The third season of the American animated television series The Simpsons originally aired on the Fox network between September 19, 1991, and August 27, 1992. The showrunners for the third production season were Al Jean and Mike Reiss who executive produced 22 episodes for the season, while two other episodes were produced by James L. Brooks, Matt Groening, and Sam Simon, with it being produced by Gracie Films and 20th Century Fox Television. An additional episode, "Brother, Can You Spare Two Dimes?", aired on August 27, 1992, after the official end of the third season and is included on the Season 3 DVD set. Season three won six Primetime Emmy Awards for "Outstanding Voice-Over Performance" and also received a nomination for "Outstanding Animated Program" for the episode "Radio Bart". The complete season was released on DVD in Region 1 on August 26, 2003, Region 2 on October 6, 2003, and in Region 4 on October 22, 2003.

Production
Al Jean and Mike Reiss, who had written for The Simpsons since the start of the show, took over as showrunners this season. Their first episode as showrunners was "Mr. Lisa Goes to Washington" and they felt a lot of pressure about running the show. They also ran the following season and Jean would return as executive producer in season 13. There were two episodes, "Kamp Krusty" and "A Streetcar Named Marge", that were produced at the same time, but aired during season four as holdover episodes. Two episodes that aired during this season, "Stark Raving Dad" and "When Flanders Failed", were executive produced during the previous season by James L. Brooks, Matt Groening and Sam Simon.

Carlos Baeza and Jeffrey Lynch received their first directing credits this season. Alan Smart, an assistant director and layout artist, would receive his only directing credit. One-time writers from this season include Robert Cohen, Howard Gewirtz, Ken Levine and David Isaacs. Bill Oakley and Josh Weinstein, who would later become executive producers, became a part of the writing staff to replace Jay Kogen and Wallace Wolodarsky both of whom had decided to leave the next season. The current arrangement of the theme song by music composer Alf Clausen was introduced during this season, corresponding with the show now being produced and broadcast in Dolby Surround.

A crossover episode with the live-action sitcom Thirtysomething, titled "Thirtysimpsons", was written by David M. Stern for this season, but was never produced because it "never seemed to work". The crossover would involve Homer meeting a group of Yuppies and hanging out with them.

The season premiere episode was "Stark Raving Dad", which guest starred Michael Jackson as the speaking voice of Leon Kompowsky. One of Jackson's conditions for guest starring was that he voiced himself under a pseudonym. While he recorded the voice work for the character, all of his singing was performed by Kipp Lennon, because Jackson wanted to play a joke on his brothers. Michael Jackson's lines were recorded at a second session by Brooks. The January 30, 1992 rerun of the episode featured a brief alternate opening, which was written in response to a comment made by then-President of the United States George H. W. Bush. On January 27, 1992 Bush made a speech during his re-election campaign where he said, "We are going to keep on trying to strengthen the American family, to make American families a lot more like The Waltons and a lot less like The Simpsons." The writers decided that they wanted to respond by adding a response to the next broadcast of The Simpsons, which was a rerun of "Stark Raving Dad" on January 30. The broadcast included a new tongue-in-cheek opening where they watch Bush's speech. Bart replies, "Hey, we're just like the Waltons. We're praying for an end to the Depression, too".

On April 30, The Simpsons aired a repeat episode opposite the final episode of The Cosby Show on NBC. After the episode was over, a short clip of new animation showed Bart and Homer happily watching The Cosby Show finale. Bart asks Homer why Bill Cosby took the show off the air when it is still very popular. Homer replies that, "Mr. Cosby wanted to end the show before the quality began to suffer."  Bart replies, "Quality, shmality. If I had a TV show, I'd run that baby into the ground!"

"Homer at the Bat" is the first episode in the series to feature a large supporting cast of guest stars. The idea was suggested by Sam Simon, who wanted an episode filled with real Major League Baseball players. They did manage to get nine players who agreed to guest star and they were recorded over a period of six months. Several new characters were introduced this season, including Lunchlady Doris, Fat Tony, Legs and Louie, Rabbi Hyman Krustofski, Lurleen Lumpkin, and Kirk and Luann Van Houten.

This season's production run (8F) was the last to be animated by Klasky Csupo, before the show's producers Gracie Films opted to switch domestic production of the series to Film Roman. Sharon Bernstein of the Los Angeles Times wrote that "Gracie executives had been unhappy with the producer Csupo had assigned to The Simpsons and said the company also hoped to obtain better wages and working conditions for animators at Film Roman." Klasky Csupo co-founder Gábor Csupó had been "asked [by Gracie Films] if they could bring in their own producer [to oversee the animation production]," but declined, stating, "they wanted to tell me how to run my business."

Voice cast & characters

Main cast
 Dan Castellaneta as Homer Simpson, Grampa Simpson, Krusty the Clown, Groundskeeper Willie, Troy McClure, Barney Gumble and various others
 Julie Kavner as Marge Simpson, Patty Bouvier, Selma Bouvier and various others
 Nancy Cartwright as Bart Simpson, Nelson Muntz, Ralph Wiggum and various others
 Yeardley Smith as Lisa Simpson
 Harry Shearer as Mr. Burns, Waylon Smithers, Ned Flanders, Principal Skinner, Lenny Leonard, Kent Brockman, and Reverend Lovejoy
 Hank Azaria as Moe Szyslak, Chief Wiggum, Professor Frink, Comic Book Guy  and Apu

Recurring
 Pamela Hayden as Milhouse van Houten, Jimbo Jones
 Maggie Roswell as Maude Flanders, Helen Lovejoy and Miss Hoover
 Russi Taylor as Martin Prince and Sherri and Terri
 Tress MacNeille as Mrs. Bloomenstein, Kim and Davey 
 Marcia Wallace as Edna Krabappel
 Jon Lovitz as Artie Ziff, Professor Lombardo and the doughnut delivery man
 Jo Ann Harris as background characters
 Joe Mantegna as Fat Tony and TV Fat Tony (himself)
 Frank Welker as Santa's Little Helper, various other animals

Guest stars

 Phil Hartman as Troy McClure, Lionel Hutz, various others (various episodes)
 John Jay Smith as Leon Kompowsky; Kipp Lennon provided the vocals ("Stark Raving Dad")
 Neil Patrick Harris as TV Bart Simpson (himself; "Bart the Murderer")
 Jackie Mason as Hyman Krustofsky ("Like Father, Like Clown") 
 Steven Tyler, Tom Hamilton, Joey Kramer, Joe Perry, and Brad Whitford  as themselves ("Flaming Moe's")
 Sting as himself ("Radio Bart")
 Roger Clemens, Mike Scioscia, Don Mattingly, Steve Sax, Ozzie Smith, Wade Boggs, Darryl Strawberry, Ken Griffey Jr. and José Canseco as themselves ("Homer at the Bat")
 Terry Cashman as himself ("Homer at the Bat")
 Steve Allen as Bart's electronically altered voice ("Separate Vocations")
 Beverly D'Angelo as Lurleen Lumpkin ("Colonel Homer")
 Kelsey Grammer as Sideshow Bob ("Black Widower")
 Christopher Guest as Nigel Tuffnel ("The Otto Show")
 Michael McKean as David St. Hubbins ("The Otto Show")
 Kimmy Robertson as Samantha Stanky ("Bart's Friend Falls in Love")
 Danny DeVito as Herb Powell ("Brother, Can You Spare Two Dimes?")
 Joe Frazier as himself ("Brother, Can You Spare Two Dimes?")

Reception
The season was critically acclaimed and remains popular among the show's fanbase. In 2003, Entertainment Weekly published a list of its 25 favorite episodes and placed "Homer at the Bat", "Flaming Moe's" and "Radio Bart" at 15th, 16th and 20th positions, respectively. On Rotten Tomatoes, the third season of The Simpsons has a 100% approval rating based on 5 critical  reviews.IGN.com made a list of the best guest appearances in the show's history, and placed Aerosmith at 24, Spinal Tap at 18, the "Homer at the Bat" baseball players at 17, Jon Lovitz at eight, and Michael Jackson at number five. IGN would later name "Flaming Moe's" the best episode of the third season. Chris Turner, the author of the book Planet Simpson, believes that the third season marks the beginning of "the Golden Age" of The Simpsons and pinpoints "Homer at the Bat" as the first episode of the era. Bill Oakley has described the season as "the best season of any TV show of all time", pinpointing its success to the fact that "a lot of the stories were pretty grounded, but they took a couple of crazy leaps out into space with like, ‘Homer at the Bat’", stating that he and Josh Weinstein used the season as a model when they were The Simpsons' showrunners for seasons 7 and 8. John Swartzwelder considered the season to be the best one during his time on the show saying, "By Season 3 we had learned how to grind out first-class 'Simpsons' episodes with surprising regularity, we had developed a big cast of characters to work with, we hadn’t even come close to running out of story lines, and the staff hadn’t been worn down by overwork yet. Season 3 was a fun year to be in the 'Simpsons' writers' room, and I think it shows in the work."

Awards
1992 was The Simpsons' most successful year at the Primetime Emmy Awards, with the series receiving six Emmys, all for "Outstanding Voice-Over Performance", a category which is juried rather than competitive. The recipients were: Nancy Cartwright as Bart Simpson in "Separate Vocations"; Dan Castellaneta as Homer Simpson in "Lisa's Pony"; Julie Kavner as Marge Simpson in "I Married Marge"; Jackie Mason as Rabbi Hyman Krustofski in "Like Father, Like Clown"; Yeardley Smith as Lisa Simpson in "Lisa the Greek"; and Marcia Wallace as Edna Krabappel in "Bart the Lover". Mason is the only irregular guest star from the show to win an Emmy. The series received three other Emmy nominations: for "Outstanding Animated Program" with the episode "Radio Bart"; for "Outstanding Individual Achievement in Music Composition for a Series (Dramatic Underscore)" (Alf Clausen) and "Outstanding Individual Achievement in Sound Mixing for a Comedy Series or a Special" (Brad Brock, Peter Cole, Anthony D'Amico, Gary Gegan), both for the episode "Treehouse of Horror II".

The series also won an Annie Award for Best Animated Television Production, an Environmental Media Award nomination for "Best Television Episodic Comedy" for the episode "Mr. Lisa Goes to Washington", and a People's Choice Award nomination for "Favorite Series Among Young People".

At the 8th annual Television Critics Association Awards, the third season of the show was nominated for 'Outstanding Achievement in Comedy,' losing to "Seinfeld." Additionally, it was nominated for 'Program of the Year' but lost to "Northern Exposure."

Episodes

DVD release
The DVD box set for season three was released by 20th Century Fox Home Entertainment in the United States and Canada on August 26, 2003, eleven years after it had completed broadcast on television. As well as every episode from the season, the DVD release features bonus material including commentaries for every episode. The commentaries were recorded in early 2003.

References

Further reading

External links

Season 3 at the BBC

Simpsons season 03
1991 American television seasons
1992 American television seasons